Aida Milagros Delgado-Colón (born August 31, 1955) is a United States district judge for the District of Puerto Rico. She was nominated by President George W. Bush in 2005, to a seat vacated by Salvador E. Casellas.

Education and career

Delgado-Colón was born in Lares, Puerto Rico. She received a Bachelor of Arts degree from the University of Puerto Rico in 1977 and a Juris Doctor from the Pontifical Catholic University of Puerto Rico School of Law in 1980. She worked in the Department of Labor and Human Resources of the Commonwealth of Puerto Rico from 1980 to 1981 and then held various positions in the Office of the Public Defender of the U.S. District Court for the District of Puerto Rico from 1982 to 1993. Delgado-Colón was an adjunct professor, Pontifical Catholic University of Puerto Rico School of Law from 2003 to 2004.

Federal judicial service
Nominated by President George W. Bush in 2005, to a seat vacated by Salvador E. Casellas, her nomination was endorsed by Resident Commissioner and Republican National Committeeman Luis Fortuño and Democratic National Committeeman and Puerto Rico Senate President Kenneth McClintock.

Delgado-Colón is a United States district judge of the United States District Court for the District of Puerto Rico. She was nominated by President George W. Bush on October 25, 2005, to a seat vacated by Salvador E. Casellas. She was confirmed by the Senate on March 6, 2006, and received  her commission on March 17, 2006. She served as Chief Judge since from 2011 to 2018.

She is only the second female on the bench in the District of Puerto Rico, after District Judge and former Chief Judge Carmen Consuelo Vargas, who has served for nearly three decades.  In 2011, she also became the second female Chief Judge in the District of Puerto Rico, succeeding Judge José A. Fusté, she served in that capacity until April 13, 2018, being succeeded by Gustavo Gelpí.

See also

List of Hispanic/Latino American jurists
List of Puerto Ricans

References

External links

1955 births
Living people
People from Lares, Puerto Rico
Hispanic and Latino American judges
Pontifical Catholic University of Puerto Rico faculty
Public defenders
Puerto Rican judges
Judges of the United States District Court for the District of Puerto Rico
United States district court judges appointed by George W. Bush
21st-century American judges
University of Puerto Rico alumni
United States magistrate judges
21st-century American women judges